Humberto Delgado Airport , informally Lisbon Airport and previously Portela Airport, is an international airport located  northeast of the city centre of Lisbon, the capital of Portugal. The airport is the main international gateway to Portugal. As of 2021, it was the 16th-largest airport in Europe in terms of passenger volume, and carried 190,700,00 tonnes of cargo. It is an important European hub to Brazil, the largest European Star Alliance hub to South America and also a European hub to Africa.

The airport is the main hub of Portugal's flag carrier TAP Air Portugal, including its subsidiary TAP Express, as well as being a hub for low-cost airlines Ryanair and easyJet. It is a focus city for Azores Airlines, euroAtlantic Airways, Hi Fly and White Airways. The airport is run by ANA Aeroportos de Portugal, which was concessioned to the French group Vinci SA in February 2013.

Lisbon airport has consistently ranked dismally in customer satisfaction, with AirHelp polling it in last place amongst 132 airports in the world as of 2022. It is one of the most congested airports of Europe and one of the only major airports to have an approach path directly over the city, notwithstanding plans to build a new airport elsewhere. These plans have for decades been postponed or suspended for a myriad of reasons.

History

Early years

The airport opened on 15 October 1942, during World War II, and initially operated in conjunction with the Cabo Ruivo Seaplane Base: seaplanes performed transatlantic flights, and passengers were transferred onto continental flights operating from the new airport. As a neutral airport it was open to both German and British airlines, and was a hub for smuggling people into, out of, and across Europe. It is widely referenced in the classic film Casablanca, whose plot revolves around an escape attempt to Lisbon airport. As such, it was heavily monitored by both Axis and Allied spies. Although Portugal was neutral, the airport was used by allied flights en route to Gibraltar, North Africa and Cairo.

At the end of the war the airport developed rapidly, and by 1946 was used by major airlines such as Air France, British European Airways, Iberia, KLM, Sabena, Pan Am and Trans World Airlines. By 1954 the number of passengers reached 100,000.

A 1951–52 airport diagram shows four runways laid out at 45-degree angles: 1,350 m Runway 5, 1,024 m Runway 9, 1,203 m Runway 14, and 1,170 m Runway 18. Runways 5 and 36 were each later extended northward to a length of 1,999 m.

Major upgrades from 1959 to 1962 included a new runway capable of handling the first generation of jets, such as the Boeing 707 and Douglas DC-8. The first jet aircraft flight was an Air France Caravelle in 1960. In 1962 runway 02/20 came into use. It was 3130 m long and would allow direct transatlantic flights. The first direct flight to New York was operated by TWA with a Boeing 707, who later operated the first Boeing 747 service in 1970. When TAP ordered the 747 in 1972, five large parking bays were built, and the terminal was enlarged. A major upgrade to the buildings and facilities commenced in 1983, and the first air bridges were added in 1991.

Along with the airports in Porto, Faro, Ponta Delgada, Santa Maria, Horta, Flores, Madeira, and Porto Santo, the airport's concessions to provide support to civil aviation were conceded to ANA Aeroportos de Portugal on 18 December 1998, under provisions of decree 404/98. With this concession, ANA became responsible for the planning, development and construction of future infrastructure.

Airport expansion
The airport is now surrounded by urban development, being one of the few airports in Europe located inside a major city. This led to a national debate on whether to keep the present location or to build a new airport; the last option was chosen. In 2007 an independent study coordinated by the Portuguese Industry Confederation (CIP) suggested Alcochete as an alternative location (see Alcochete Airport). A military training facility currently occupies the site, but the military agreed to abandon the location provided it could transfer its facility to a different area. A second government-contracted study led by the National Laboratory of Civil Engineering (LNEC) concluded in late 2007 that Alcochete was the best location.

The selection of Alcochete was announced on 10 January 2008, more than 35 years after the first capacity increase studies were initiated. The Portuguese government announced that Alcochete was the preliminary choice, to be finalised after public consultation. The location of Alcochete as the construction site of the future Lisbon Airport was confirmed by the government on 8 May 2008, but the contract was shelved as part of Portugal's cost-cutting austerity measures, and completely dismissed from Portugal's transportation strategy plans in July 2013, with investment being concentrated on expanding and further improving the existing Lisbon Airport infrastructure.

In November 2006 the operating company ANA Aeroportos de Portugal, announced an expansion plan for some airport structures in order to respond to current passenger traffic growth trends, and full capacity use of the airport, which had been intended to respond to growth until the new airport was to be finished in 2017.  This plan involved the construction of a new 2nd terminal called Terminal 2 (concluded and operational since August 2007), and expansion of Terminal 1 with new boarding gates (concluded in 2011), a large new shopping and restaurant area, new airbridges and parking positions, a more efficient use of currently existing structures, and a new underground Metro de Lisboa station inaugurated in July 2012.

Terminal 2 is used by 6 scheduled low-cost flight airlines for departures to European destinations, while Terminal 1 handles all arrivals and regular scheduled and chartered flights. In October 2010, European low-cost airline easyJet officially opened a new base at Lisbon Airport, exclusively using Terminal 2 for departures to 20 destinations. A free shuttle bus connects Terminal 1 Departures area and Terminal 2 every ten minutes.

Between 2007 and 2013, Lisbon Airport underwent several structural and equipment improvements and expansions. These included the construction of Terminal 2, lighting and baggage claim refurbishment, new cargo facilities, fuel storage, north pier and boarding lounge, north bus gate and baggage claim, enlargement of express cargo facilities, electrical refurbishments, departure lounge refurbishments and underground station and other terminal improvements all of which have been completed. As part of the definite solution for Lisbon Airport, in July 2013 a new commercial area was inaugurated in the Terminal 1 air side area with 20 new stores and spacious naturally lighted internal circulation areas. In July 2015, a significantly larger food court was introduced, catering to more tastes and delicacies.

With the long-term concession of ANA Aeroportos de Portugal to the French group Vinci Airports the project for a new airport was postponed in July 2013, and it was decided that the existing Lisbon Airport would be further upgraded to surpass 22 million passengers annually and would remain the present solution for this major European gateway. Ryanair had predicted that it will double the number of passengers it carries from the airport in the three years from 2014.

In January 2019, Portugal's government unveiled a 1.1-billion-euro ($1.26 billion) plan to expand Lisbon's current airport and build a second one. National airports operator ANA is footing the bill to adapt a military airfield in Montijo,  by road from Lisbon. It aims to handle around 50 million passengers a year from 2022. The airports company will also pay for the expansion of the existing airport in the capital. With around 29 million passengers a year, Humberto Delgado Airport is at full capacity, having been in 2019 the busiest single-runway airport in mainland Europe.

Naming
In February 2015, Lisbon city council unanimously agreed to propose that the name of Lisbon International Airport, known as Portela due to its geographical location, be changed to Humberto Delgado Airport. The proposal, tabled by the Socialist leadership under former Mayor António Costa, was agreed to by councillors from across party lines.

The Portuguese government under current Prime Minister António Costa, announced in February 2016 that Lisbon Portela Airport would be renamed on 15 May 2016 after Humberto Delgado, in memory of the late Portuguese air force general and famous politician. "He was an opposition figure to the dictatorship regime... and had a very important role in the field of civil aviation," Minister of Planning and Infrastructure Pedro Marques said at a press conference after the meeting of Council of Ministers, stressing that it was Humberto Delgado who presided over the foundation of Portugal's flagship airline TAP and "so it is very fair this assignment name to the airport". 2016 marks the 110th anniversary of the birth of Humberto Delgado, who was also known as the "Fearless General" due to his staunch opposition to Salazar's rule and his participation in the 1958 Portuguese presidential election.

Terminals
Lisbon Humberto Delgado Airport features two passenger terminal buildings:

Terminal 1
Terminal 1 is the main building and features large landside and airside areas containing several shops and service facilities. It consists of two check-in halls, the older one has been converted into TAP Air Portugal's self check-in area, and the newer one housing 68 desks (37–89 and 90–106). The joint departures area features 47 gates (17 of which are equipped with jet-bridges) with 21 of them designated to non-Schengen destinations. As the airport features several more apron stands, bus boarding is often used here. Most airlines use Terminal 1, including TAP Air Portugal, its Star Alliance partners, Oneworld Alliance and, exceptionally, easyJet.

Terminal 2
Terminal 2 is the much smaller, newest of the two terminals in the airport, used exclusively by low-cost carriers. It is located away from Terminal 1 on the southern border of the airport perimeter. It has 22 check-in desks (201–222), designated to each particular low-cost carrier, and 15 departure gates (201–215) using mainly walk boarding but also bus. There are only standard facilities, a few shops and service counters. The terminal is reachable via the free airport shuttle service from Terminal 1. The users of Terminal 2 are Ryanair, Wizz Air, Transavia, Transavia France, Vueling, Eurowings and Norwegian.

Airlines and destinations
The following airlines operate regular scheduled passenger flights at Lisbon Airport:

Statistics

Ground transportation

Train
Trains to all parts of the country are available at Gare do Oriente station, the main train station in Lisbon. The airport connects to the station via metro in approximately 10 minutes. Alternatively travelers can take the bus to the station, albeit with slightly longer travel times.

Metro

Aeroporto Metro station lies at the Southern edge of the Terminal 1 arrivals area. The Aeroporto Saldanha line takes approximately 20 minutes to reach downtown Lisbon. To use the metro, passengers must purchase a 7 Colinas/Viva Viagem card, which can be topped up and used on the metro and bus network.

Bus
Carris city buses stop at the airport arrivals section, and connect to Marquis of Pombal Square, and Amoreiras. Night routes run to downtown Baixa, as well as Cais do Sodré and Gare do Oriente train stations. City buses have a maximum luggage size of 50 cm × 40 cm × 20 cm. Travelers with larger luggage must take the aerobus or airport shuttle.

Aerobus
Aerobuses prepared for traveling with large luggage are available at Terminal 1 and Terminal 2 between 07:30 and 23:00 daily, and connect the airport with a number of major destinations in the downtown area, including the Sete Rios bus and train terminal, and Entrecampos, Cais do Sodré, and Rossio railway terminals. Buses have access for those with reduced mobility, and offer free Wi-Fi and USB chargers.

Shuttle
Shuttles are available to transport travelers around the airport, and to locations not serviced by aerobuses.

Taxi
Lisbon city taxis are readily available 24 hours a day outside the arrival and departure areas of the airport. A trip to Lisbon city centre by taxi takes approximately 15 minutes.

Car
The airport is easily accessible by several major highways and main roads. ANA operates several covered and open parking areas. Valet service, car hire, and chauffeur limousine services are also available.

Bicycle
Two bicycle paths connect the airport roundabout, situated 300 m south of Terminal 1 to the city's 70 km cycle infrastructure network. One path heads west along Av. do Brasil to the University of Lisbon main campus, passing through the central neighbourhoods of Alvalade, Campo Grande and Entrecampos and connecting with other paths to Telheiras, Colégio Militar, Benfica, and Monsanto Forest Park. The other bicycle path heads east from the roundabout towards Olivais, Gare do Oriente train station and Parque das Nações Expo 98 site, connecting with the riverside bicycle path Southwards along Lisbon harbour to Santa Apolónia train station, cruise ship and ferry terminals, and the historic centre, and north to the Caminho do Tejo pilgrimage trail to Fátima and Santiago de Compostela.

Other facilities
TAP Air Portugal has a complex at Lisbon Airport housing many head offices and the TAP Museum Archives, where visitors can make appointments to view materials including photographs, advertising material, flight logs and manuals. In 1989 TAP became the owner of the complex due to a governmental decree. TAP's head office is in Building 25. The TAP subsidiary Serviços Portugueses de Handling, S.A. (SPdH) has its head office on the 6th floor of Building 25. Sociedade de Gestão e Serviços, S.A. (TAPGER), another TAP subsidiary, has its head office on the 8th floor of the same building. Building 19 has the head office of Sociedade de Serviços e Engenharia Informática, S.A. (Megasis), a TAP information services subsidiary. The TAP documentation and archive is in the annex of Building 19. Building 34, on the far north side of the complex, houses the company's new data processing centre.

ANA Aeroportos de Portugal has its head office in Building 120. Portugália has its head office in Building 70. The TAP catering subsidiary, Catering de Portugal, S.A. (CATERINGPOR), has its head office in Building 59. Cuidados Integrados de Saúde, S.A. (UCS) is based out of Building 35.

Accidents and incidents
 1 February 1947 – an Air France Douglas C-47 crashed into the Sintra Mountains, killing 15 of 16 people on board.
 12 April 1959 – a Douglas C-47 of the Portuguese Air Force crashed into the River Tagus after takeoff. All 11 people on board were killed.
 4 December 1980 – a Cessna 421 carrying Prime Minister of Portugal Francisco de Sá Carneiro and other government officials, crashed into buildings in Camarate after takeoff, killing everyone on board.

See also
Transport in Portugal
List of airports in Portugal
List of eponyms of airports

References

External links

 
 

Airports in Portugal
Buildings and structures in Lisbon
Transport in Lisbon
Airfields of the United States Army Air Forces Air Transport Command in the European Theater
Airports established in 1942
1942 establishments in Portugal